Ashes to Ashes: America's Hundred-Year Cigarette War, the Public Health, and the Unabashed Triumph of Philip Morris, written by Richard Kluger and published by Alfred A. Knopf in 1996, won the 1997 Pulitzer Prize for General Non-Fiction. 

The book took Kluger seven years to research and write.

References

External links

1996 non-fiction books
History books about the United States
Pulitzer Prize for General Non-Fiction-winning works
Smoking in the United States
Books about health
Alfred A. Knopf books
Cigarettes
Philip Morris USA